Leverage Factory is an independent, privately held American publisher based in Bend, Oregon. It publishes supplemental education books and online materials.

History
Publisher Joel Bush founded Leverage Factory in 2005 and launched it in 2006, as a custom project publisher of coffee table-style books for large corporate clients. The company later changed its business model to focus on producing trade books and distributing supplemental education products.

Awards
"Be a Better Writer" won the Independent Publisher Book Awards Gold Medal for Juvenile-Teen-Young Adult Non-Fiction.

References

External links
 Leverage Factory
 Be a Writer Website

Publishing companies of the United States
Companies based in Bend, Oregon
Publishing companies established in 2005
Privately held companies based in Oregon
2005 establishments in Oregon